Kanishka or Kaniska may refer to
Kanishka (c. AD 127–163), emperor of the Kushan dynasty 
Kanishka II (c. AD 225–245), emperor of the Kushan dynasty 
Kanishka III (c. AD 268), emperor of the Kushan dynasty 
Kanishka Chaugai (born 1986), Nepalese cricketer
Kaniska Kulasekera (born 1973), Sri Lankan cricketer
Kanishka Raffel, Australian Anglican cleric
Kanishka Singh (born 1978), Indian politician
Kanishka Soni (born 1987), Indian actress and model
Kanishka Raja (1970-2018), American artist
Kanischka Taher (born 1991), Afghan footballer

Sinhalese masculine given names